Akan Chandra Rabha is an Asom Gana Parishad politician from Assam. He was elected in Assam Legislative Assembly election in 1985 and 1996 from Dudhnai constituency.

References 

Living people
Asom Gana Parishad politicians
Assam MLAs 1985–1991
Assam MLAs 1996–2001
People from Goalpara district
Year of birth missing (living people)
Place of birth missing (living people)